Polán is a municipality located in the province of Toledo, Castile-La Mancha, Spain. According to the 2014 census, the municipality has a population of 3,952 inhabitants.

Administration
This is the list of mayors from the democratic elections since 1979.

Demographics
The following table shows the number of inhabitants of Polan between 1996 and 2005 according to data from the INE.

References

External links

Comarca de los Montes de Toledo - Caminos a Guadalupe

Municipalities in the Province of Toledo